The Department of Tourism, Leisure and Transport is a former department of the Isle of Man Government.

History
Prior to 1990 the Department was known as the Department of Tourism and Transport.

In 1990 the Department of Tourism and Transport was given the extra responsibility of Leisure and thus renamed the Department of Tourism, Leisure and Transport with a new Minister of Tourism, Leisure and Transport.

In 1994 there was a departmental reorganisation.  The Department of Highways Ports and Properties and this Department of Tourism, Leisure and Transport became the Department of Tourism and Leisure and the Department of Transport.

Previous Ministers of Tourism, Leisure and Transport Ministers
Allan Bell MHK, 1990-1994

Previous Ministers of Tourism and Transport
Allan Bell MHK, 1986-1990

See also
Council of Ministers
Minister of Tourism and Leisure
Minister of Tourism and Transport
Minister of Transport.

Government of the Isle of Man
Tourism in the Isle of Man
Transport in the Isle of Man